Anna Angyal (1848–1874) was a Hungarian-Jewish author. She also served as a governess.

Biography
Born in Veszprim in 1848, she attended the Jewish community school of her birthplace, and later that in the town of Hódmezővásárhely, where her father was a teacher. Versed in Hungarian, French, and German literature, Angyal began her literary career at the age of sixteen. Her first novella, Egy magyar család kalandjai ('Adventures of a Hungarian Family'), was published in the Hungarian magazine Szegedi Hiradó. In 1865 she published in the Magyar Izsráelita a short novel entitled Előítéletek ('Prejudices'), in which she described the condition of the Jews in Hungary. Her historical novel, Ilonka és Elemér, was published in 1868.

After the completion of this novel, she accepted a position as governess in Pest, where she wrote several poems and an autobiography. She died after succumbing to an illness in the autumn of 1874.

References

Bibliography
 

1848 births
1874 deaths
Jewish Hungarian-language writers
Austro-Hungarian Jews
People from Veszprém
Jewish poets
19th-century Hungarian women writers
19th-century Jews
Hungarian women novelists
Hungarian women poets
Jewish women writers
Governesses